The Cathedral of St. Luke may refer to:

United Kingdom
Greek Orthodox Cathedral of St. Luke, Glasgow, Scotland

United States
Cathedral Church of St. Luke (Orlando, Florida)
Cathedral Church of St. Luke (Portland, Maine)
Cathedral of St. Luke and St. Paul (Charleston, South Carolina)

See also
St. Luke's Church (disambiguation)